Howard D. White (born June 15, 1936 in Salt Lake City, Utah) is a scientist in library and information science with a focus on informetrics and scientometrics.

He has published on bibliometrics and co-citation analysis, evaluation of reference services, expert systems for reference work, innovative online searching, social science data archives, library publicity, American attitudes toward library censorship, and literature retrieval for meta-analysis and interdisciplinary studies.

After taking his Ph.D in librarianship at the University of California, Berkeley, in 1974, White joined the Drexel University College of Information Science and Technology, where he is now professor emeritus.

Awards
In 1993, he won the Research Award of the American Society for Information Science and Technology (ASIST) for distinguished contributions in his field. In 1998, he and Katherine McCain won the best JASIS paper award for "Visualizing a Discipline: An Author Co-Citation Analysis of Information Science, 1972-1995".

He was a Drexel Distinguished Professor for 1998–2002, using the grant awarded to develop the AuthorMap system. In 2004, he won ASIST’s highest honor for career achievement, the Award of Merit. In 2005, the International Society for Scientometrics and Informetrics honored him with the biennial Derek de Solla Price Memorial Medal for contributions to the quantitative study of science.

References

External links 
Howard White's webpage

1936 births
American librarians
Drexel University faculty
Living people